"Family Snapshot" is a song written and performed by English rock musician Peter Gabriel, appearing on his third eponymous album.

Content
The song was inspired by An Assassin's Diary, published in 1973 and written by Arthur Bremer, who, on May 15, 1972, attempted to assassinate George Wallace, a politician who supported racial segregation.  Gabriel talked about the book in a 1988 authorized biography:

Gabriel stated in the introduction to the song during his concert at the Paramount Theatre, Seattle, 10 August 1983, that the song is, "partly taken from the writings of Arthur Bremer and The Diary of an Assassin and mixed with a few images of Dallas twenty years ago".

The musical transition reflects the progress and emotions throughout the story. It starts off as a slow, understated piece, where the killer goes through his plan, becoming more intense as the target unwittingly comes closer to the assassin. Finally, the song transitions back to a quiet, mournful climax as the shooter, having just shot his target, remembers his childhood loneliness and thirst for attention that led him to where he now is.

The recording features Gabriel's first use of the Yamaha CP-70 Electric Grand Piano.

Personnel
 Peter Gabriel – vocals, piano
 David Rhodes – guitar
 Jerry Marotta – drums
 Larry Fast – synthesizer
 Phil Collins – snare drum
 John Giblin – bass
 Dave Gregory – guitar
 Dick Morrissey – saxophone

References

1980 songs
Peter Gabriel songs
Songs written by Peter Gabriel
Song recordings produced by Steve Lillywhite